Eirenidae is a family of hydrozoans.

Genera 
The following genera are recognized within the family Eirenidae:

 Eirene Eschscholtz, 1829
 Eugymnanthea Palombi, 1936
 Eutima McCrady, 1859
 Eutimalphes Haeckel, 1879
 Eutonina Hartlaub, 1897
 Helgicirrha Hartlaub, 1909
 Irenium Haeckel, 1879
 Neotima Petersen, 1962
 Phialopsis Torrey, 1909
 Tima Eschscholtz, 1829

References 

 
Leptothecata
Cnidarian families
Taxa named by Ernst Haeckel